The Du Faur Creek, a perennial stream of the Hawkesbury-Nepean catchment, is located in the Blue Mountains region of New South Wales, Australia.

Course
The river has an  course.

The river is named in honour of Frederick Du Faur (1832–1915), an early Chief Draftsman of the NSW Department of Lands, a Fellow of the Royal Geographical Society and a Trustee of the Art Gallery of New South Wales.

See also

 List of rivers of Australia
 List of rivers in New South Wales (A-K)
 Rivers of New South Wales

References

External links
 

Rivers of New South Wales
Rivers of the Blue Mountains (New South Wales)